Cody Likeke Barton (born November 13, 1996) is an American football linebacker for the Washington Commanders of the National Football League (NFL). He played college football at Utah and was drafted by the Seattle Seahawks in the third round of the 2019 NFL Draft.

Professional career

Seattle Seahawks
Barton was drafted by the Seattle Seahawks in the third round (88th overall) of the 2019 NFL Draft. He made his professional debut in Week 3 of the 2019 season and recorded his first takeaway in the same game after recovering a muffed punt from New Orleans Saints returner Deonte Harris. He spent the majority of his rookie season on Seattle's special teams units and led the team in special teams snaps. He became a starting linebacker in the 2020 season.

Washington Commanders
Barton signed a one-year contract with the Washington Commanders on March 16, 2023.

Personal life
Barton's older brother, Jackson, was drafted by the Indianapolis Colts in the seventh round (240th overall) of the 2019 NFL Draft. They played in the same class at Utah after Jackson redshirted. His sister, Dani, is a member of the United States women's national volleyball team.

References

External links
 Washington Commanders bio
 Utah Utes bio

1996 births
Living people
American football linebackers
Players of American football from Salt Lake City
Seattle Seahawks players
Washington Commanders players
Utah Utes football players